Baihar tehsil is a fourth-order administrative and revenue division, a subdivision of third-order administrative and revenue division of Balaghat district of Madhya Pradesh.

Geography
Baihar tehsil has an area of 910.50 sq kilometers. It is bounded by Mandla district in the northwest and north, Chhattisgarh in the northeast, east and southeast, Lanji tehsil  in the south, Kirnapur tehsil in the southwest, Paraswada tehsil in the west.

See also 
Balaghat district

References

External links

Tehsils of Madhya Pradesh
Balaghat district